The Borders and Coastguard Agency is the combined border guard and coast guard of Gibraltar. It was established as a statutory agency by an Act of the Gibraltar Parliament and has been operating since 1 November 2011. Customs duties are handled by His Majesty's Customs.

Mission
The stated mission of the Borders and Coastguard Agency is: "to maintain a secure and fluid border and protect against criminal acts that threaten the security of travel, by enforcing the law and securing the confidence of travellers, in order to keep our homes safe and Gibraltar open for business".

Role
Its role is to act as the main Gibraltar authority for aviation, maritime and land travel security and immigration. Gibraltar has an airport and a sea port, and shares a land border with Spain.

Officers
The duties of the Borders and Coastguard Agency are carried out by uniformed officers.

Uniform
Officers wear a typical British police-type agency uniform:
 Peaked cap (males) or bowler cap (females) with red and white chequered cap band
 White shirt
 Black tie
 Black trousers
 Long-sleeved or short-sleeved black jacket
 High-visibility kit vest
 Black T-shirt
 Black baseball cap

See also
 List of law enforcement agencies in the United Kingdom, Crown Dependencies and British Overseas Territories
 Royal Gibraltar Police (RGP)
 Gibraltar Defence Police (GDP)
 His Majesty's Customs (Gibraltar)

References

Government of Gibraltar